Aleksandrowice is an osiedle (district) of Bielsko-Biała, Silesian Voivodeship, southern Poland. It is located in the central-west part of the city, in Silesian Foothills. The osiedle has an area of 1.6988 km2 and on December 31, 2006 had 1,821 inhabitants.

History 
The settlement arose after parcellation of a local folwark situated then in the southern part of Stare Bielsko which took place in years 1787–1790. It was later industrialized in part with a wider industrial growth of Bielsko and its surroundings. Politically it belonged then to the Duchy of Bielsko, within the Habsburg monarchy.

After the Revolutions of 1848 in the Austrian Empire a modern municipal division was introduced in the re-established Austrian Silesia. The village became a part of the municipality of Stare Bielsko that was subscribed to the political and legal district of Bielsko. It became a separate municipality in 1864.

According to the censuses conducted in 1880, 1890, 1900 and 1910 the population of the municipality grew from 1797 in 1880 to 2426 in 1910 with a majority being native German-speakers (between 77.3% and 87.3%) accompanied by a Polish-speaking minority (at most 22.1% in 1890) and a few Czech-speaking people (at most 12 or 0.6% in 1890), in terms of religion in 1910 majority were Protestants (50.4%), followed by Roman Catholics (47.5%), Jews (51 or 2.1%) and 2 persons adhering to yet another religion. It was then considered to be a part of a German language island around Bielsko (German: Bielitz-Bialaer Sprachinsel).

After World War I, fall of Austria-Hungary, Polish–Czechoslovak War and the division of Cieszyn Silesia in 1920, it became a part of Poland. It was then annexed by Nazi Germany at the beginning of World War II. After the war it was restored to Poland. The local German-speaking population fled or was expelled.

Aleksandrowice became administratively a part of Bielsko in 1938 (Bielsko-Biała since 1951).

References 

Bielsko-Biała
Neighbourhoods in Silesian Voivodeship
Cieszyn Silesia